Benjamin Kauffmann (born 14 July 1988) is a German footballer who plays as a winger.

Career

After playing in 1860 Munich's youth team, Kauffmann played for the reserve team of two Bavarian clubs, Wacker Burghausen, and later FC Ingolstadt 04. At Ingolstadt he was given his senior debut, playing for the first-team in a 2. Bundesliga match against Hertha BSC at the Olympiastadion in October 2010. He came on as a substitute for Moritz Hartmann for the last seven minutes of a 3–1 defeat to the eventual champions.

Kauffmann signed for Potsdam club SV Babelsberg 03 in July 2011. He scored in each of his first two appearances, and made 42 appearances for the club in eighteen months before he returned to Bavaria in January 2013 to sign for SpVgg Unterhaching. A year later he signed for Goslarer SC.

References

External links

Benjamin Kauffmann at FuPa

1988 births
Sportspeople from Ingolstadt
Footballers from Bavaria
Living people
German footballers
Association football wingers
SV Wacker Burghausen players
FC Ingolstadt 04 players
SV Babelsberg 03 players
SpVgg Unterhaching players
Goslarer SC 08 players
FSV Wacker 90 Nordhausen players
FC Ingolstadt 04 II players
FC Pipinsried players
2. Bundesliga players
3. Liga players
Regionalliga players
Oberliga (football) players